Lindsay Vere Duncan  (born 7 November 1950) is a Scottish actress. On stage, she has won two Olivier Awards (for Les Liaisons Dangereuses and Private Lives) and a Tony Award (for Private Lives). She has starred in several plays by Harold Pinter. Her best-known television roles include Barbara Douglas in Alan Bleasdale's G.B.H. (1991), Servilia of the Junii in the HBO/BBC/RAI series Rome (2005–2007), Adelaide Brooke in the Doctor Who special "The Waters of Mars" (2009), and Lady Smallwood in the BBC series Sherlock. On film, she portrayed Anthea Lahr in Prick Up Your Ears (1987), voiced the android TC-14 in Star Wars: Episode I – The Phantom Menace (1999) and Alice's mother in Tim Burton's Alice in Wonderland (2010), and played acerbic theatre critic Tabitha Dickinson in Birdman or (The Unexpected Virtue of Ignorance) (2014).

Early life
Duncan was born into a working-class family in Edinburgh, Scotland. Her father had served in the British army for 21 years before becoming a civil servant. Her parents moved to Leeds, then Birmingham, when she was still a child. She attended King Edward VI High School for Girls in Birmingham through a scholarship. Despite her origins, she speaks with a received pronunciation accent. As of 2011, her only role with a Scottish accent is AfterLife (2003).

Duncan's father died in a car accident when she was 15. Her mother was affected by Alzheimer's disease and died in 1994; she inspired Sharman Macdonald to write the play The Winter Guest (1995), directed by Alan Rickman, which he later adapted as a film.

Career
Duncan's first contact with theatre was through school productions. She became friends with future playwright Kevin Elyot, who attended the neighbouring King Edward's School for boys, and followed him to Bristol, where he read Drama at university. She did a number of odd jobs while staging her own production of Joe Orton's Funeral Games.

Duncan joined London's Central School of Speech and Drama at the age of 21. After her training, she started out in summer weekly rep in Southwold to gain her Equity card. She appeared in two small roles in Molière's Don Juan at the Hampstead Theatre in 1976, and joined the Royal Exchange Theatre, Manchester when it opened. She performed in the first productions at the Royal Exchange and appeared in eight plays in Manchester in the next two years. In 1978 she returned to London in Plenty by David Hare at the National. She appeared on the television in small roles in a special episode of Up Pompeii!, in The New Avengers, and a commercial for Head & Shoulders shampoo. 

She made her breakthrough on Top Girls by Caryl Churchill, staged at the Royal Court in London and later transferred to the Public Theater in New York, Her performance as Lady Nijo, a 13th-century Japanese concubine, won her an Obie, her first award. 

The following year, she took her first major role on film in Richard Eyre's Loose Connections with Stephen Rea. At the same time her television work included a filmed version of Frederick Lonsdale's On Approval (1982), Reilly, Ace of Spies (1983) and Dead Head (1985).

In 1985, she joined the Royal Shakespeare Company for the production of Troilus and Cressida, in which she played Helen of Troy. In September she created the role of the Marquise de Merteuil in Les Liaisons Dangereuses, the play by Christopher Hampton after the French novel by Choderlos de Laclos, which opened at The Other Place in Stratford-upon-Avon. On 8 January 1986, the production transferred to the 200-seat theatre The Pit in London's Barbican Centre, with its original cast. In October of that year, the production moved to the Ambassadors in the West End. In April 1987, the cast, including Duncan, took the play to Broadway. For her performance, she was nominated for a Tony and won the Olivier Award for Best Actress and a Theatre World Award. She was replaced by Glenn Close for Dangerous Liaisons — Stephen Frears's film of the play; similarly John Malkovich was selected for the role of Valmont instead of Duncan's co-star Alan Rickman.

In 1988, Duncan won an Evening Standard Award for her role of Maggie in Cat on a Hot Tin Roof by Tennessee Williams. At the same time, she became a regular in the plays of Harold Pinter and the television work of Alan Bleasdale and Stephen Poliakoff. In 1994–95, she performed for a second season with the RSC in A Midsummer Night's Dream, in the double role of Hippolyta and Titania, replacing Stella Gonet from the original production cast. She went on tour in the United States with the rest of the cast, but back and neck pains forced her to be replaced by Emily Button from January to March 1997. Impressed by her performance in David Mamet's The Cryptogram (1994), Al Pacino asked Duncan to play the role of his wife in City Hall (1996) by Harold Becker.

To please her young son, a Star Wars fan, Duncan applied for the role of Anakin Skywalker's mother in Star Wars: Episode I – The Phantom Menace (1999) but was not cast; she finally accepted to voice an android TC-14. She reunited with Alan Rickman in a revival of Noël Coward's Private Lives (2001–02) and won a Tony Award for Best Actress and a second Olivier Award for her performance as Amanda Prynne; she was also nominated that year for her role in Mouth To Mouth by Kevin Elyot.

Duncan played Servilia Caepionis in the 2005 HBO-BBC series Rome, and starred as Rose Harbinson in Starter for 10. Aged by make-up, she played Lord Longford's wife, Elizabeth, in the TV film Longford. In February 2009, she played British Prime Minister Margaret Thatcher in Margaret. In November 2009, she played Adelaide Brooke, companion to the Doctor, in the second of the 2009 Doctor Who specials. She played Alice's mother in Tim Burton's 2010 film Alice in Wonderland, alongside Mia Wasikowska, Johnny Depp and Helena Bonham Carter. She also starred in the original London run of Polly Stenham's play That Face at the Royal Court co-starring Matt Smith and directed by Jeremy Herrin. She narrated the Matt Lucas and David Walliams 2010/2011 fly-on-the-wall mockumentary series Come Fly with Me on the BBC. In October–November 2010, she starred in a new version by Frank McGuinness of Ibsen's John Gabriel Borkman at the Abbey Theatre, Dublin alongside her Liaisons dangereuses co-stars Alan Rickman and Fiona Shaw. The production transferred in January–February 2011 to the Brooklyn Academy of Music.

Alan Bleasdale asked Duncan to appear in his first work for television after ten years of absence, The Sinking of the Laconia, aired in January 2011. She played an upper-class passenger in the two-part drama based on a true story of World War II. She also played the mother of Matt Smith in the telefilm Christopher and His Kind written by Kevin Elyot after Christopher Isherwood's autobiography of the same title. In October–November 2011, Duncan read extracts of the King James Bible at the National Theatre, London as part of the 400th anniversary celebrations of the translation. She played Queen Annis, ruler of Caerleon and antagonist of Merlin, in the 5th episode of the fourth series of BBC1's Merlin. She also appeared as Home Secretary Alex Cairns to Rory Kinnear's Prime Minister in "The National Anthem", the first episode of Charlie Brooker's anthology series Black Mirror.

Duncan started 2012 as a guest in the New Year special of Absolutely Fabulous, playing Saffy's favourite film actress, Jeanne Durand. In February, she returned to the West End in Noël Coward's Hay Fever with Kevin McNally, Jeremy Northam and Olivia Colman, once again under the direction of Howard Davies. Later in 2012, she was featured in BBC2's productions of Shakespeare's history plays. She played the Duchess of York in the first film, Richard II, with David Suchet as the Duke of York and Patrick Stewart as John of Gaunt.

In October 2014, Duncan appeared as Claire in the revival of Edward Albee's A Delicate Balance on Broadway. That year, she also appeared in the film Birdman, or (The Unexpected Virtue of Ignorance), which won the Academy Award for Best Picture.

Personal life
Duncan is married to fellow Scottish actor Hilton McRae, whom she met in 1985 at the Royal Shakespeare Company. They live in North London. They have one son, Cal McRae, born September 1991.

Duncan was appointed a Commander of the Order of the British Empire (CBE) in the 2009 Birthday Honours, for her services to drama.

Filmography

Film

Television

Theatre

Adverts

References

External links

 
 

1950 births
Living people
Actresses from Edinburgh
People educated at King Edward VI High School for Girls, Birmingham
Alumni of the Royal Central School of Speech and Drama
Critics' Circle Theatre Award winners
Drama Desk Award winners
Laurence Olivier Award winners
Commanders of the Order of the British Empire
Royal Shakespeare Company members
Scottish film actresses
Scottish radio actresses
Scottish stage actresses
Scottish television actresses
Scottish voice actresses
Tony Award winners
20th-century Scottish actresses
21st-century Scottish actresses
Scottish Shakespearean actresses